This is a list of earthquakes in 1945. Only magnitude 6.0 or greater earthquakes appear on the list. Lower magnitude events are included if they have caused death, injury or damage. Events which occurred in remote areas will be excluded from the list as they wouldn't have generated significant media interest. All dates are listed according to UTC time. The last year of World War II was dominated by two events which caused the vast bulk of the death toll. In January, over 2,300 were killed by a large magnitude 6.6 quake in Japan. In November, a magnitude 8.1 quake caused a devastating tsunami leading to 4,000 deaths in Pakistan. In terms of large events, most activity occurred in the western Pacific Ocean. Japan, New Guinea, and the southwest Pacific Islands saw several events with a magnitude over 7.0.

Overall

By death toll 

 Note: At least 10 casualties

By magnitude 

 Note: At least 7.0 magnitude

Notable events

January

February

March

April

May

June

July

August

September

October

November

December

References

1945
 
1945